Rags Brook is a tributary of the Small River Lea, which is a tributary of the River Lea. Rags Brook rises in the hills between Goffs Oak Cuffley in Hertfordshire, England. Brookfield Lane follows the course of the brook and the Brookfield Centre reflects the brook in its name.

The highest river level recorded at Rosedale Way, Cheshunt was 1.57 metres and the river level reached 1.57 metres on 11/06/2012.

The brook runs through Cuffley and Cheshunt before converging with Turnford Brook in the area known as Cheshunt Wash, before joining the Small River Lea.

Rivers of Hertfordshire
Tributaries of the River Lea
2Rags